Kings Mills is a census-designated place in the southwestern corner of Deerfield Township, Warren County, Ohio, United States, on the western shore of the Little Miami River. Located along I-71 twenty miles northeast of Cincinnati, it is less than a mile east of Mason, two miles southwest of South Lebanon, two and one-half miles north of Fosters, and two miles west of Hopkinsville.

Another town, Gainsboro, was platted on this site in 1815, but it did not prosper. Kings Mills was established in 1884 as a company town for the King Powder Company, and the Peters Cartridge Company which ceased operations in 1944.

The town is in the Mason (513) telephone exchange and is served by the Kings Mills/Kings Island post office (45034). It is in the Kings Local School District.

The Little Miami Scenic Trail, which runs from Milford to Spring Valley, passes by the community on the eastern shore of the Little Miami River in the former Little Miami Railroad right-of-way.

Kings Island amusement park and Great Wolf Lodge indoor water park are immediately south of the community in Mason. Kings Mills was formerly the home of the College Football Hall of Fame, which moved to South Bend, Indiana in 1995.

References

Unincorporated communities in Warren County, Ohio
Unincorporated communities in Ohio
Populated places established in 1884
Company towns in Ohio
1884 establishments in Ohio